Alexander Urbom (born December 20, 1990) is a professional Swedish ice hockey defenceman. He is currently playing with EC Red Bull Salzburg of the ICE Hockey League (ICEHL).

Playing career
Urbom was drafted by the New Jersey Devils in the third round, 73rd overall, in the 2009 NHL Draft. He previously played for Djurgårdens IF in Elitserien and Brandon Wheat Kings in the WHL.

He scored his first NHL goal on April 10, 2011, against Tuukka Rask of the Boston Bruins.

Urbom was claimed off waivers to start the 2013–14 season by the Washington Capitals on October 3, 2013. After appearing in 20 games throughout the first half of the season with the Capitals, Urbom returned on waivers to be reacquired by the Devils on January 8, 2014.

After four seasons in North America, Urbom opted to leave as a restricted free agent, signing a two-year contract with Russian club, Severstal Cherepovets of the KHL on June 6, 2014. After one season in the KHL, Urbom opted to return to the SHL, signing with Skellefteå AIK.

He returned to original club, Djurgårdens IF on loan from Skellefteå AIK in the second year of his two-year contract.

After three seasons in his second spell with DIF, Urbom left Sweden as a free agent following the 2018–19 season, signing a one-year contract with German club, Düsseldorfer EG of the Deutsche Eishockey Liga (DEL), on May 7, 2019.

As a free agent into the 2020–21 season, Urbom was belatedly signed for the remainder of the season with Austrian club, EC Red Bull Salzburg of the ICE Hockey League, on February 16, 2021.

Career statistics

References

External links

1990 births
Living people
Albany Devils players
Brandon Wheat Kings players
Djurgårdens IF Hockey players
Düsseldorfer EG players
New Jersey Devils draft picks
New Jersey Devils players
Severstal Cherepovets players
Skellefteå AIK players
Ice hockey people from Stockholm
Swedish ice hockey defencemen
Washington Capitals players